Zira may refer to:
 Zira, Bushehr
 Zira, West Azerbaijan